The Fiat 500 is a rear-engined, four-seat, small city car that was manufactured and marketed by Fiat Automobiles from 1957 until 1975 over a single generation in two-door saloon and two-door station wagon bodystyles.

Launched as the Nuova (new) 500 in July 1957, as a successor to the 500 "Topolino", it was an inexpensive and practical small car.

In 1959, Dante Giacosa received a Compasso d'Oro industrial design prize for the Fiat 500. It was the first time when it was awarded to an automotive industry.

In 2007, the 50th anniversary of the Nuova 500's launch, Fiat launched another new 500, stylistically inspired by the 1957 Nuova 500, featuring a front-mounted engine and front-wheel drive.

In 2017 Fiat celebrated the 60th anniversary with an exhibit at the Museum of Modern Art in New York City and received one of the Corporate Art Awards by pptArt at an event hosted by the President of the Italian Republic Sergio Mattarella at the Quirinal Palace.

History
In 1936, Fiat released the front engine Fiat 500 "Topolino" economy car. In 1949 to meet the demands of the post-war market, production resumed as the 500C with revised front and rear bodywork. It had a 2-door coupe body with sun-roof, which was later complemented by an Estate version. Both continued until 1957 when they were replaced by an all-new, lighter car. The new car had a rear-mounted engine, on the pattern of the Volkswagen Beetle, just like its bigger brother the 1955 Fiat 600. Several car makers followed the now uncommon rear engine configuration at the time and were quite successful. The Neckar version of the 500 was manufactured in Heilbronn under a complicated deal involving NSU, and was introduced in October 1961.  Steyr-Puch produced cars based on the Fiat 500 under licence in Graz, Austria.

Despite its very small size, the 500 proved to be an enormously practical vehicle with large sales throughout Europe.

Sports models were produced by Abarth, as well as by Giannini. An Austrian variant, produced by Steyr-Daimler-Puch, the 1957–1973 Steyr-Puch 500, had a motorcycle-derived Puch boxer twin motor, a sports model of which was the 1965–1969 Steyr-Puch 650 TR2.

Production of the 500 ended in 1975, although its replacement, the Fiat 126, was launched two years earlier. The 126 was not as successful as its predecessor in Italy, but sold well in the Eastern Bloc countries, being assembled and manufactured in Poland as a Polski Fiat. The Fiat 500 has a Cx (aerodynamic resistance coefficient) of 0,38, a very good performance for its time.

Models

Nuova 500 (1957–1961)

The 500 features a 479 cc (500cc nominal) two-cylinder engine, hence the name, producing just 13 horsepower. This model also features a fabric roof, foldable to the rear of the vehicle, like that of a Citroën 2CV — rather than the later roof design, which only folds half way back along the roof. The Nuova 500 is one of three models featuring "suicide doors."

Including the Sport model, in total 181,036 examples of the Nuova 500 were produced from 1957 until 1960.

Nuova 500 Sport (1958–1960)
In mid-1958 Fiat introduced the Nuova 500 Sport, featuring a more powerful engine and a two-tone livery—white with a red stripe along the flanks. Unique to the Sport was an all-metal rigid roof with three longitudinal grooves. A short-open-roof model was added a year later, in 1959.

Coded type 110.004, the 500 Sport's two-cylinder engine had been bored out to 499.5 cc from the original 479 cc (bore and stroke now ), giving it a very respectable horsepower with the same block: .

500 D (1960–1965)

Replacing the original Nuova in 1960, the D looks very similar to the Nuova, but there are two key differences. One is the engine size (the D features an uprated 499 cc engine producing 17 bhp as standard—this engine is used right through until the end of the L in 1973) and the other is the roof: the standard D roof does not fold back as far as the roof on the Nuova, though it was also available as the "Transformable" with the same roof as the Nuova. The D also features "suicide doors".

In New Zealand, where it was locally assembled by Torino Motors, the 500 D was sold as the "Fiat Bambina" (Italian for "baby"), a name that is still in use there to describe this car.

500 Giardiniera (1960–1968)

The 500 Giardiniera (500 K on some markets) estate version of the Fiat 500 is the longest running model. The engine is laid under the floor of the boot to create a flat loading surface. The roof on this model also stretches all the way to the rear, not stopping above the driver and front passenger as it does in other models of the same period. The Giardiniera also features "suicide doors" and was the only model to continue to use this door type into the 1970s. In 1966 production was transferred to Desio where the Giardiniera was built by Fiat subsidiary Autobianchi under their marque from 1968 to 1977. A total of 327,000 Giardinieras were produced, and from 1968 sold only as Autobianchi Giardiniera.

500 Furgoncino
A panel van variant of the Giardiniera (estate) was offered as the Furgoncino.

500 F or Berlina (1965–1973)

The F spans two periods of 500 production, the D and the L. As such, it is the most frequently misidentified model. Between 1965 and 1969 the F carried the same badging as the D, but the two models are distinguishable by the positioning of their door hinges. The D has "suicide doors": the F, produced from June 1965, at last featured front-hinged doors. Between 1969 and 1972 the F was sold alongside the Lusso model as a cheaper "base model" alternative. While the F and L are mechanically very similar, the key differences are the bumpers (the L has an extra chrome nudge bar) and the interior (the F interior is nearly identical to the original 1957 design while the L sports a much more modern look).

500 L or Lusso (1967—1971)

In September 1968 Fiat put on sale the 500 L or Lusso (tipo 110 F/L), a more richly trimmed and better appointed version of the standard 500 F. The 500 L remained on sale until 1972, when the new Fiat 126 was introduced.

Perhaps the most obvious new feature of the 500 L were tubular guards protecting the front bumper and the corners of the rear one. Other model-specific exterior items were a new Fiat badge at the front, redesigned hubcaps, chrome plastic mouldings covering the roof drip rails, and bright trim around windscreen and rear window. Inside the dashboard was entirely covered in black anti-glare plastic material instead of being bare painted metal, and was fitted with a new trapezoid instrument binnacle replacing the round one used on all other 500 models. The steering wheel was black plastic with metal spokes. The door cards—upholstered in the same pleated pattern leatherette used on the seats—carried redesigned and relocated door handles and new door pockets. More storage space was provided in the form of a tray on the centre tunnel, which like the rest of the floor was covered in carpet rather than rubber mats.
Except for radial instead of bias ply tires, from a mechanical standpoint the 500 L was identical to the coeval 500 F.

500 R or Rinnovata (1971—1976)
The last incarnation of the Fiat 500 was the R model. It had the same 594 cc engine of the Fiat 126, however, the power rating is the same as the L but at lower rpm (4000 instead of 4400) and with a bit more torque; a full synchromesh gearbox is still missing. The floor-pan which was from either the 'L', or later, the new 126. It was also more comfortable, but more simply trimmed and equipped than before — the fuel gauge was omitted and only the low fuel indicator remained. The 500 R was also a stop-gap for Fiat prior to the launch of the Fiat 126, and when the new 126 was launched, sales of the old Fiat 500 R plummeted. It was sold alongside the Fiat 126 for another two years before Fiat retired the 500.

Fiat 500 America
During the years in which it was produced the 500 in Italy, Fiat designed and produced a US-market version of the car with prominent headlamps (also used on the American 500 Jolly). About 300 were made between 1958 and 1962.

Derivatives

Abarth 695 SS (1964–1971)
Of all the performance-oriented models created by Karl Abarth, later known as Carlo Abarth, perhaps the 695 esse esse is the best representation of the scorpion-branded firm's collaboration with Fiat. Around 1,000 Fiat Abarth 695 SS were produced and only 150 are believed to remain.

Abarth introduced its 695 SS version in 1966, after the previous presentation back in 1964. The rear-engine, rear-wheel-drive layout Fiat 500 was the basis of the project. When compared to the production version of the 500, aesthetically the 695 was virtually identical except for the logo, badge on the radiator grille and the coat of arms on both sides of the car. The 695 SS was the only version to feature flared arches and the need to raise the engine cover for extra stability and cooling.

The OHV 2 valves per cylinder inline-two engine, exhaust pipe, head and valve-springs were upgraded and specially designed pistons and camshaft fitted.

Fiat 500 Jolly Ghia
Carrozzeria Ghia custom manufactured a "Jolly" variant of the 500, inspired by the limited edition Fiat 600 Jolly, and featuring an open-air, doorless design with wicker seats and a removable fabric canopy roof — similar in concept to the Citroën Méhari, BMC Mini Moke and Volkswagen Type 181.

2007 Fiat 500

First announced in May 2006, Fiat previewed an all-new four-seat three-door hatchback 500 model in March 2007 – fifty years after the first Fiat 500 was presented. The design of the 2007 Fiat 500 is based on the 2004 Fiat Trepiùno concept.

The new model features a distinctive retro style – following the pattern of the Volkswagen New Beetle and BMW MINI – as modern reinterpretation of Dante Giacosa's 1957 original rear-engined Fiat 500. Production started in mid-2007 in Fiat facilities in Tychy, Poland, and later in Toluca, Mexico. Numerous trim, equipment, and performance versions are offered with a convertible body style available starting in 2009.

The 500 is also offered in Abarth trim, with 1.4L Turbo Petrol engine, sport exhaust, suspension, and transmission.

The Fiat 500 automobile platform is the basis of the second-generation Ford Ka.

See also

Autobianchi Bianchina – based on the Fiat 500 mechanicals.
Giannini Automobili - Abarth's main competitor for selling tuned 500s.
Fiat 126 – successor to the Fiat 500 in many markets.
Zastava 750 – a similar car produced by Yugoslavia's Zastava
Fiat 500 "Topolino" – the predecessor, and "original" 500.
Fiat 600 – the model above the 500, only slightly larger in size and engine displacement.
Fiat Cinquecento – "five hundred" in Italian.
Fiat 500X – a mini SUV
Puch 500 – the Austrian licence produced version.
BMW 600 – introduced in the same year, the only four-seat car that was even shorter than the 500.

References

Sources
 Abarth 595 695, Elvio Deganello and Renato Donati, Giorgio Nada, 2002 
Album Fiat 500, di J.J. Galkowsky, EPA Edition 
Autopassion Hors Serie, Auto collection n. 22
 Fiat & Abarth 500-600, Malcolm Bobbit, Veloce Publishing 
 Fiat 500, Elvio Deganello,  Giorgio Nada, 2002 
 Fiat 500, Alessandro Sannia, Motorbuch-Verlag, Stuttgart 2007, .
 Fiat 500 – az apró, mégis óriási legenda, Alessandro Sannia, Alexandra, 2006, .
Fiat 500 – de kleine grote mythe, Alessandro Sannia, Rebo, 2006, 
 Fiat 500 fuoriserie, Alessandro Sannia, All Media, 2003
  Fiat 500 (genio di un'epoca), Ugo Castagnotto and Anna Maria Quarona, Lindau, 1992 .
 Fiat 500 – guida al restauro, Marcello Lo Vetere and Italo Grossi, Giorgio Nada, 2003 .
 Fiat 500 Gold Portfolio 1936–1972, R.M. Clarke, Brooklands 
 Fiat 500: la Guida – the Guide, Alessandro Sannia, All Media, 2003
 Fiat 500 – l'evoluzione del mito, Alessandro Sannia, Gribaudo, 2007, 
 Fiat 500 – piccolo grande mito, Alessandro Sannia, Gribaudo, 2005, .
   I miei 40 anni alla Fiat,  Dante Giacosa
 Il grande libro delle giardinette Fiat, Alessandro Sannia, Giorgio Nada, 2007, .
  Io Franco Giannini vi racconto, Franco Giannini
  La 500, by Romano Strizioli, pub. by Bacchetta
  La Fiat 500 – Storia di un mito, Stefano Parenti, Polo Books .
 La Fiat Nuova 500, Enzo Altorio,  Automitica, 2005 
 La Fiat 500 de mon père, Lauvrey - Le Fay,  E.T.A.I. 1998 
 Le Giannini, Enzo Altorio, Automitica
  "Fiat 500" Topolino, Paulo Felizes, Matosinhos: Cardume, 2016 
Progetti alla Fiat prima del computer, Dante Giacosa, Automobilia .
  Revue Technique Automobile 500, D, F, L,  ì E.T.A.I.
  Fiat 500, 600 : mit Topolino, Jagst, Multipla und Weinsberg ; 1936–69 ; eine Dokumentation, Schrader Verlag, München 1987, .

External links
FIAT 500 Models 2012-2015 - US Market 
FIAT 500 Instruction Manual (1st gen.)

City cars
Sedans
Convertibles
Station wagons
Vans
500
Rear-engined vehicles
Rear-wheel-drive vehicles
Cars introduced in 1957
Cars powered by 2-cylinder engines
1960s cars
1970s cars